Columbus Police could refer to several police departments in the United States, including:

 Columbus, Georgia Police Department, a local law enforcement agency in Georgia
 Columbus, Indiana Police Department, a local law enforcement agency in Indiana
 Columbus, Kansas Police Department, a local law enforcement agency in Kansas
 Columbus, Mississippi Police Department, a local law enforcement agency in Mississippi
 Columbus, Nebraska Police Department, a local law enforcement agency in Nebraska
 Columbus, North Carolina Police Department, a local law enforcement agency in North Carolina
 Columbus Division of Police, the main policing unit for the city of Columbus, Ohio
 Columbus, Texas Police Department, a local law enforcement agency in Texas